Sue Thomas (May 24, 1950 – December 13, 2022) was an American author and former FBI agent, who was the first deaf person to work as an undercover specialist doing lip-reading of suspects.

Early life
Thomas was born on May 24, 1950, in Boardman, Ohio. At the age of 18 months, she became profoundly deaf; the reason is not definitely known. At the age of seven, Thomas became the youngest Ohio State Champion free-style skater in skating history. Speech therapists helped her develop her voice, and she also became an expert lip reader.

Thomas graduated from Springfield College in Massachusetts with a degree in political science and international affairs.

Career in the FBI
At the FBI, Thomas started out as a fingerprint examiner, then she became a lip-reader for an undercover surveillance team. Thomas spent four years working for the FBI, from 1979 to 1983.

Writing
In 1990, Thomas wrote her autobiography entitled Silent Night, which became the basis for the TV series to follow. This book begins when she lost her hearing at 18 months and chronicles her life all the way through to her resignation from the FBI. The continuing story of her life is called Staying In The Race, where Thomas shares stories about living with multiple sclerosis.

TV series
In 2002, the TV series Sue Thomas: F.B. Eye, created jointly by Dave Alan Johnson and Gary R. Johnson, premiered on the Pax TV first-run syndication network. Inspired by Thomas' unique job for the FBI, the weekly drama helped to bring more awareness to the lives and abilities of those with physical challenges. The series starred actress Deanne Bray, who is herself deaf, and reads lips like Thomas, and it was loosely based on Thomas' real experiences. At its peak, the series was watched by more than 2.5 million viewers in the United States, and it was syndicated to 60 nations. In September 2009, the show began airing on Gospel Music Channel.

In addition to Bray, the cast of Sue Thomas: F.B. Eye included actors Yannick Bisson, Rick Peters, Mark Gomes, Tara Samuel, Ted Atherton and Enuka Okuma. A golden retriever who responded to the name of Jesse stood in during the run of the program for Thomas' real golden retriever, who responded to the name of Levi. Marilyn Stonehouse served as the chief producer for the Pebblehut Productions company, through which Sue Thomas: F.B. Eye was produced.

Sue Thomas appeared in two episodes: "Billy the Kid (aka: Question Mark)" and the series finale, "Ending and Beginnings".

Personal life
In 2001, Thomas was diagnosed with multiple sclerosis. In 2020, she was diagnosed with lung cancer, though the following year, she said she was cancer-free. Thomas died on December 13, 2022.

References

External links
 

1950 births
2022 deaths
20th-century American memoirists
21st-century American memoirists
American deaf people
Federal Bureau of Investigation agents
People from Boardman, Ohio
People with multiple sclerosis
Springfield College (Massachusetts) alumni
Writers from Youngstown, Ohio